Jeffrey Overstreet is a novelist, film critic, and professor who  resides in Shoreline, Washington.

Biography
Overstreet teaches at Seattle Pacific University. His film reviews have been published in Paste, Image: A Journal of the Arts and Religion, Christianity Today, Risen, and Seattle Pacific University's Response magazine.  His work has also been highlighted in TIME magazine. In 2007, Overstreet received the Spiritus Award at the City of the Angels Film Festival in recognition of his writing on cinema.

Critical reception
Through A Screen Darkly earned a "Starred Review" from Publishers Weekly. Filmmaker Darren Aronofsky has said of the book that it is "Inspirational... sometimes all of us forget that love for movies, that internal spark inside us that movies lit, and your book is going to remind many of us about it."

Selected bibliography

References

External links

Official website
 
 
 

Year of birth missing (living people)
21st-century American novelists
American film critics
American male novelists
American science fiction writers
Living people
Seattle Pacific University people
People from Shoreline, Washington
Writers from Portland, Oregon
21st-century American male writers
Novelists from Oregon
21st-century American non-fiction writers
American male non-fiction writers